Sanshanjie station, is a station of Line 1 of the Nanjing Metro. Construction on the station began in 1992 in order for the Metro's engineers and designers to experiment and test their plans. Construction for the rest of Line 1 began eight years later in December 2000.

Around the station
 Former Residence of Gan Xi
 Jiangnan Examination Hall
 Jinjue Mosque
 Nanjing Fuzimiao

Gallery

References

Railway stations in Jiangsu
Railway stations in China opened in 2005
Nanjing Metro stations